Alain Pierre Joseph Attalah (born 5 October 1964) is an Egyptian basketball coach and former player. He is the current head coach of Lions de Genève of the Swiss Basketball League (SBL). 

As a player, Attallah competed with the Egypt national basketball team at the 1984 and 1988 games. He posted an Olympic high of 22 points and 5 assists in a 138-85 loss to Brazil in 1988.

From 2018 to 2022, Attallah was the head coach of Swiss club BBC Nyon.

References

1964 births
Living people
Egyptian men's basketball players
1990 FIBA World Championship players
Basketball players at the 1984 Summer Olympics
Basketball players at the 1988 Summer Olympics
Olympic basketball players of Egypt